The thirteenth season of King of the Hill originally aired Sunday nights on the Fox Broadcasting Company from September 28, 2008, to September 13, 2009. Four episodes from this season originally premiered in syndication from May 3 to May 6, 2010. Actress Brittany Murphy, who voiced Luanne Platter, died of pneumonia on December 20, 2009, five months before the final four episodes aired. It is the final season of the show's initial run and the last to air on Fox.

Production
The showrunners for the season were John Altschuler and Dave Krinsky. Beginning with the episode "Lucky See, Monkey Do", King of the Hill started being produced in 720p 16:9 high-definition. 20th Century Fox Television initially ordered 13  production episodes, but decided to keep the show in production for four additional episodes.

Like the previous season, because Fox wanted to make room for new shows on their "Animation Domination" line-up, two of the final six episodes aired that aired on FOX were "The Boy Can't Help It" and "To Sirloin with Love". Both episodes aired as a special one-hour series finale on September 13, 2009. The other four episodes "The Honeymooners," "Bill Gathers Moss," "When Joseph Met Lori, and Made Out with Her in the Janitor's Closet," and "Just Another Manic Kahn-Day" premiered first on local syndication in 2010, and later appeared on Cartoon Network's Adult Swim line-up as well as TV channels Comedy Central and FXX and streaming platforms Netflix, Amazon Prime, and, as of 2021, Hulu. Despite this, "To Sirloin with Love" is usually considered as the last episode of the series, since it was written as such. On Olive Films' DVD and Blu-Ray release of this season, "To Sirloin with Love" is ordered as the final episode, with the four episodes that aired in syndication during 2010 being presented in their production order, rather than in their airdate order. On Hulu, these four episodes are presented in their airdate order, with 'Just Another Manic-Kahn Day" appearing as the final episode of the series, rather than "To Sirloin with Love".

At Comic-Con's 2011 panel discussion for the return of Beavis and Butt-Head, Mike Judge stated that, although no current plans exist to revive King of the Hill, he would not rule out the possibility of it returning. On August 8, 2017, Fox Television Group CEO and chairperson Dana Walden revealed that Judge and Daniels had talked with Fox executives about a potential revival.  On January 18, 2022, Judge and Daniels announced the forming of a new company called Bandera Entertainment, with a revival of King of the Hill being one of several series in development.

Episodes

References

2008 American television seasons
2009 American television seasons
2010 American television seasons
King of the Hill 13